The Antilles Episcopal Conference (AEC) is a Roman Catholic episcopal conference. Its members are bishops and archbishops from current and former British, Dutch, and French colonies and dependencies in the Caribbean (excluding Haiti), Central America, and northern South America. The conference's membership includes five archdioceses, fourteen dioceses, and two missions sui iuris. These particular Churches minister to Catholics in thirteen independent nations, six British Overseas Territories, three departments of France, three countries of the Kingdom of the Netherlands and 3 municipalities of the Netherlands proper.

The bishop from an American insular area, the United States Virgin Islands, has been granted observer status. The episcopal conference is led by a president, who must be a diocesan ordinary and is elected by the membership of the conference for a three-year term. The conference also elects a vice president, who has the same qualifications as the president, and a treasurer, who can be a diocesan ordinary, a coadjutor bishop, or an auxiliary bishop. Additionally, a permanent board — consisting of the president, vice president, treasurer, the metropolitan archbishops and two other elected members — handles administrative issues between plenary meetings of the conference. The president of the conference is currently Gabriel Malzaire, Bishop of Roseau, while the vice president is Charles Jason Gordon, Archbishop of Port of Spain.

The Holy See appoints an apostolic delegate to the Antilles Episcopal Conference, who also serves as the Apostolic nuncio (papal ambassador) to the independent nations of the conference. The nunciature is located in Port of Spain, Trinidad and Tobago. The current apostolic delegate is Archbishop Fortunatus Nwachukwu, who replaced Archbishop Nicola Girasoli after he was appointed as Apostolic Nuncio to Peru.

Member jurisdictions

See also 
 List of Catholic dioceses (structured view)
 Caribbean Conference of Churches

References

Sources and external links 
 Antilles Episcopal Conference
 GCatholic

Antilles
Catholic Church in South America
Catholic Church in the Caribbean